Mului may refer to:
 Mului, Kerman
 Mului, Khuzestan